Robert Wayne Earl (born June 2, 1985) is an American professional ice hockey forward, who is currently an unrestricted free agent. He last played for the SCL Tigers in the National League (NL). Earl was born in Chicago, Illinois, but grew up in Los Angeles, California.

Playing career

Early career
As a youth, Earl played in the 1999 Quebec International Pee-Wee Hockey Tournament with the Los Angeles Junior Kings minor ice hockey team.

He played two years as a forward with the USA Hockey National Team Development Program Under-18 and Under-17 Programs. He ranked third on the under-18 team in 2002–03 with 33 points and 20 goals in 53 games, finishing fourth at the 2003 IIHF World Under-18 Championship in Yaroslavl, Russia. He was the game-winning goal scorer in the championship game of the 2002 World Under-17 Hockey Challenge in Stonewell, Manitoba and was fourth in scoring for the NTDP Under-17 Team with 22 goals and 16 assists in 58 games during 2001–02. He played for future Wisconsin head coach Mike Eaves at the NTDP.

Collegiate
In Earl's first season with the Badgers, he scored 27 points playing in a career high 42 games. As a Freshman he led the Badgers in points that season. He also managed to be nominated to the All-Rookie Team, tallying six power-play goals and three game-winning goals that year. His career first hat trick came in overtime against then league-leading North Dakota. During his freshman season, Earl was awarded with Insidecollegehockey.com’s National Player of the Week award and the WCHA Rookie of the Week award. He was the Toronto Maple Leafs’ fourth choice, 187th overall, in the 2004 NHL Entry Draft.

The next year, he improved his point total enough to make the roster for the Second-Team All-WCHA. This successful year led him to a team-best 20 goals, eighth total ranked eighth in the WCHA. Earl also tied the team lead with five-game-winning goals, sharing second in the WCHA where his second career hat trick came against the University of Alaska Anchorage Seawolves on November 19. He also won the WCHA Offensive Player of the Week in that same time span, the first for the University of Wisconsin–Madison since the 2000–01 season. Earl ranked third in the plus/minus department, with a rating of +17. Additionally, he started the year with a seven-game scoring streak then broke the record the same year, with eight, from January 14 to February 12.

During his Junior season with Wisconsin, Earl scored a goal in the final of the 2006 NCAA Division I Men's Ice Hockey Tournament against the Boston College Eagles, helping the Badgers win the NCAA Men's Hockey Championship. He also scored twice against the University of Maine Black Bears in the Frozen Four semifinal. As a result, Earl was selected to the Frozen Four All-Tournament team and named the Most Outstanding player. After saying he would return to the Badgers for his senior season at the school's rally for the men's and women's Frozen Four Champions, two days later he announced that he decided to join the Maple Leafs instead.

Professional
Following claiming the National Title, Earl joined the Toronto Marlies, the Maple Leafs' American Hockey League affiliate and saw action in the team's first round North Division semifinal series against the Grand Rapids Griffins in for the 2006 Calder Cup Playoffs. The following year, he scored 12 goals and 18 assists and racked up 50 penalty minutes in 67 games.

During the 2007–08 season, Earl made his NHL debut with the Toronto Maple Leafs on February 2, 2008 against the Ottawa Senators, recording one assist.

In the following season, on January 21, 2009 he was traded by the Leafs to the Minnesota Wild in exchange for Ryan Hamilton and was assigned to their AHL affiliate, the Houston Aeros. In the 2009–10 season, he was recalled to Minnesota and scored his first NHL goal on November 15, 2009 against Michael Leighton of the Carolina Hurricanes.

After two full seasons in the Minnesota Wild organization, Earl left as a free agent to begin his European career by training with Dinamo Riga of the Kontinental Hockey League on a try-out basis. Released without a contract by Riga, Earl then signed a one-year deal with EC Red Bull Salzburg of the Austrian Hockey League (EBEL) on August 12, 2011. During the 2011–12 season, Earl led Salzburg with 22 goals and contributed with 50 points in 45 games.

Earl continued his European venture when he was signed to a one-year contract with Rapperswil-Jona Lakers of the Swiss National League A on March 14, 2012. In leading the cellar-dwelling Lakers in each offensive category during the 2012–13 season, Earl was extended on a two-year contract to remain with Rapperswil on February 6, 2013. In November 2013, Earl joined EV Zug signing a contract until the end of the 2014 season. After also spending the 2014-15 season with Zug, he moved to Sweden for the 2015–16 campaign, joining SHL side Färjestad BK, where he played 33 games. Earl left the club in late January 2016 and returned to Switzerland, signing with EHC Biel until the end of the 2016–17 season.

After four seasons with Biel, Earl left having concluded his contract having earlier signed a two-year contract to continue in the NL with the SCL Tigers on December 13, 2018.

Personal
The Badgers' official site lists his grandparents as Tom and Pat McCusker. He also has two sisters, Brianne and Erin. He attended Ann Arbor Pioneer High School in Ann Arbor, Michigan, as part of the USA Hockey National Development Team. Before that he spent ninth grade at Mira Costa High School in Manhattan Beach, California. He was majoring in consumer science at Wisconsin before leaving early for the NHL.

Career statistics

Regular season and playoffs

International

Awards and honours

See also
List of black NHL players

References

External links

1985 births
Living people
African-American ice hockey players
American men's ice hockey left wingers
EHC Biel players
Färjestad BK players
Houston Aeros (1994–2013) players
Ice hockey people from Los Angeles
Ice hockey people from Chicago
Minnesota Wild players
SC Rapperswil-Jona Lakers players
EC Red Bull Salzburg players
SCL Tigers players
Toronto Maple Leafs draft picks
Toronto Maple Leafs players
Toronto Marlies players
USA Hockey National Team Development Program players
Wisconsin Badgers men's ice hockey players
EV Zug players